The Center for Natural Hazards Research is an academic research center located in Greenville, North Carolina.  The center is housed in the Department of Economics at East Carolina University.

The center focuses on hurricane, tornado, flooding and erosion hazards as they affect eastern North Carolina and the United States. Areas of active research include the financial impacts of hurricanes and floods, the effectiveness of warning systems, how policy-makers should handle evacuations, and how households can protect themselves from natural hazards. The mission of the center is to promote research and analysis that ultimately reduces the harm caused by forces of nature to life, communities and the environment.

The center is currently directed by Dr. Jamie Kruse and has 52 research associates from 15 collaborating institutions.

History 

In response to the widespread devastation suffered in the wake of Hurricane Dennis and Hurricane Floyd, ECU's College of Arts and Sciences began the groundwork for the center in 2001. The center is part of the North Carolina Institute of Disaster Studies at the University of North Carolina.

The center received more than $200,000 in grants from the National Science Foundation in 2006 to study the effects of Hurricane Katrina on the gulf region and investigate reconstruction efforts in New Orleans.  In academic year 2007-2008, the Center received more than $650,000 in grants from the National Science Foundation, National Oceanic and Atmospheric Administration, NASA, Department of the Interior, Appalachian State University and the University of North Carolina.

The center hosted its first ever "hurricon" conference in February 2020. The conference was funded by the National Science Foundation and aims to better prepare communities for hurricanes.

See also
Disaster research
East Carolina University
Natural hazards

References

External links
Center for Natural Hazards Research
East Carolina University

East Carolina University divisions